Annandale is a neighborhood in Pasadena, California. It is bordered by Colorado Boulevard to the north, San Rafael Avenue to the east, and the Pasadena-Los Angeles border to the south and west. The main roads through the neighborhood are Avenue 64 and La Loma Road.

The original town of Annandale was to the area's west and was annexed by Los Angeles on February 24, 1924.

Landmarks
Most of the commercial development in the neighborhood is in a triangular area of only a few blocks where Colorado Boulevard and Avenue 64 meet. Annandale's only park, San Rafael Park, is also in this triangular area. Most of the neighborhood consists of upper-middle-class houses built in the 1920s and 1930s. The neighborhood's relative isolation from the rest of Pasadena gives it a very different character, including a canyon with a stream. A small lake at the district's center, created for irrigation, exists from the time of the San Rafael Winery, which no longer exists.

Education
San Rafael Elementary School is the only school in the neighborhood. Annandale is served by Blair High School, in Oak Knoll, for both middle and high school.

Transportation
Annandale is served by Metro Local lines 180 and 256.

References

Neighborhoods in Pasadena, California